Buckland County is one of the 141 Cadastral divisions of New South Wales. It is situated between a small part of the Namoi River in the north to the Liverpool Range in the south. The Mooki River is the boundary to the west. It includes Quirindi.

Whilst no official record of naming of the county has been found and there can be no certainty as to the person after whom it was named it is considered possible that the county was named in honour of the Reverend Dr. Buckland.

Parishes within this county
A full list of parishes found within this county; their current LGA and mapping coordinates to the approximate centre of each location is as follows:

References

Counties of New South Wales